Killelton Church is a medieval church and a National Monument in County Kerry, Ireland.

Location

History
St Eltan founded the church here. The stone structure is dated to the 9th/10th century AD.

Restoration took place in 1984, and a holed stone was found, similar to those at Gallarus.

Description
Killelton is an oratory with a rectangular enclosure, two rectangular buildings and a bullaun.

There is a plinth at the bottom of the north and south walls, a feature characteristic of many early oratories.

References

Religion in County Kerry
Archaeological sites in County Kerry
National Monuments in County Kerry
Former churches in the Republic of Ireland